Nicole Hibbert (born 1994) is a British artistic gymnast.

Career 
Nicole Hibbert won a silver in senior team at the 2010 European Women's Artistic Gymnastics Championships.

References

Living people
1994 births
British female artistic gymnasts
21st-century British women